Kalach is a town and the administrative center of Kalacheyevsky District in Voronezh Oblast, Russia, located at the confluence of the Tolucheyevka and Podgornaya Rivers,  from Voronezh, the administrative center of the oblast. Population:

History
It was established in 1716 and granted town status in 1945.

Administrative and municipal status
Within the framework of administrative divisions, Kalach serves as the administrative center of Kalacheyevsky District. As an administrative division, it is, together with seven rural localities in Kalacheyevsky District, incorporated within Kalacheyevsky District as Kalach Urban Settlement. As a municipal division, this administrative unit also has urban settlement status and is a part of Kalacheyevsky Municipal District.

References

Notes

Sources

External links

Official website of Kalach 
Kalach Business Directory 

Cities and towns in Voronezh Oblast
Populated places established in 1716